Davidge may refer to:

 Davidge (surname)
 Davidge Gould (1758–1847), British admiral
 Davidge Page FRSE (died 1939), British chemist and mining engineer, and creator of Page's Weekly
 Davidge Data Systems, a former software company